KKL may stand for:
Kuapa Kokoo Limited
Keren Kayemet LeYisrael, the Hebrew name for the Jewish National Fund
Kampala Kids League (Uganda)
Kultur- und Kongresszentrum Luzern, the German name for the Culture and Convention Centre in Lucerne
KKL, the old name of Film & Kino
Khuda Kay Liye, Pakistani movie
 Kinmen Kaoliang Liquor, a company in Kinmen, Taiwan
 KKL or JNF-KKL, the Jewish National Fund (Israel)